Sheikh Faisal bin Hamad Al Khalifa (12 February 1991 – 12 January 2006) was a member of the Bahrain's ruling family, the House of Khalifa.

Early life and activities
Sheikh Faisal was born in at Al Sakhir Palace, East Riffa on 12 February 1991. He was the sixth son of King Hamad who has seven sons. Amongst his other titles, he was the honorary president of the Bahrain disabled sports federation. He was among those who organized the World Junior Endurance Championship in Bahrain in December 2005.

His mother is Hessa bint Faisal bin Muhammad bin Shuraim Al Marri.

Death
Sheikh Faisal was killed in a car crash on 12 January 2006. He was 14. The accident occurred near Safriya, 20 km south of Manama, when he collided with a bus at high speed, left the road, and impacted the base of an advertising sign displaying his father's picture. It was revealed that it was actually the prince who was driving at the time. Sheikh Faisal was buried early the next day at Al Rifa'a Cemetery.

Ancestry

References

External links
 Faisal bin Hamad bin Isa Al Khalifa

1991 births
2006 deaths
Faisal ibn Hamad Al Khalifa
Road incident deaths in Bahrain
Sons of kings

Royalty who died as children